Sir Henry Arthur Benyon, 1st Baronet JP (9 December 1884 – 15 June 1959) was the immediate post-War Lord Lieutenant of Berkshire.

Born Henry Arthur Fellowes in Chelsea, London, the son of James Herbert Fellowes of Kingston Maurward House near Dorchester, Dorset. His father changed his name to Benyon after inheriting the Englefield House estate in Berkshire from his uncle in 1897. He was educated at Eton College and Trinity Hall, Cambridge.

Benyon lived at Ufton Court during his father's lifetime. He was a captain in the Berkshire Yeomanry during World War I, serving in Egypt. At home, he served as High Sheriff of Berkshire in 1925 and was the Lord Lieutenant from 28 March 1945 until his death in 1959. He was also a Berkshire County Councillor. He had inherited his father's estates – as well as the patronage of St Mark's Church, Englefield and St Peter's Church, De Beauvoir Town, Hackney – in 1935 and was created a baronet, of Englefield in the Royal County of Berkshire on 8 July 1958.

In 1915 he married Violet Eveline, daughter of Sir Cuthbert Edgar Peek, but left no heirs-male and Englefield passed to his second cousin-once-removed, William Richard Shelley. He enjoyed hunting and shooting.

Benyon died on 15 June 1959, aged 74.

References

Burke's Landed Gentry.
Who's Who Series. (1936). Who's Who in Berkshire. London.

External
 Photograph by Elliott & Fry in NPG (1954).

1884 births
1959 deaths
Military personnel from London
British Army personnel of World War I
People from Dorchester, Dorset
People from Englefield, Berkshire
Alumni of Trinity Hall, Cambridge
People educated at Eton College
Baronets in the Baronetage of the United Kingdom
Councillors in Berkshire
High Sheriffs of Berkshire
Lord-Lieutenants of Berkshire
Berkshire Yeomanry officers
Benyon family